SS West Riding was a freight vessel built for the Goole Steam Shipping Company in 1894.

History

The ship was built by Joseph Scarr, Grovehill, Beverley for the Goole Steam Shipping Company and launched in September 1894  and used as a multi purpose water, coal bunkering vessel and fire float.

In 1905 she was acquired by the Lancashire and Yorkshire Railway.

In 1922 she was acquired by the London and North Western Railway and one year later by the London, Midland and Scottish Railway.

She was scrapped in 1947.

References

1894 ships
Steamships of the United Kingdom
Ships built in England
Ships of the Lancashire and Yorkshire Railway
Ships of the London and North Western Railway
Ships of the London, Midland and Scottish Railway